The 1902–03 United States collegiate men's ice hockey season was the 9th season of collegiate ice hockey.

Regular season

Standings

References

1902–03 NCAA Standings

External links
College Hockey Historical Archives

 
College